India–Oman relations are foreign relations between the Republic of India and the Sultanate of Oman. India has an embassy in Muscat, Oman. During British rule in India, Bombay presidency controlled Oman for the British Empire. An Indian consulate was opened in Muscat in February 1955 which was upgraded to a consulate general in 1960 and later into a full-fledged embassy in 1971. The first ambassador of India arrived in Muscat in 1973. Oman established its embassy in New Delhi in 1972 and a consulate general in Mumbai in 1976. India and Oman have had trade and people-to-people ties for several millennia. Oman is home to a large Indian expatriate community and for Oman, India is an important trading partner. Politically, Oman has been supportive of India's bid for permanent membership of the United Nations Security Council.

History
Trade between India and Oman has a history of several millenniums and archaeological excavations in Oman have unearthed evidence to show Indo-Oman trade in the during the Classical Age dated to circa third century BCE. Later, Oman had links with the Indian states in Gujarat and along the Malabar Coast. The Indian prince Tipu Sultan sent a diplomatic delegation to Oman during his reign. 

In August 1957, during one of the Lok Sabha debates, the then Prime Minister of India Jawaharlal Nehru, replying to a question asked on British Armed Forces interference in Oman said, "We have received indirectly a message purporting to come from some representatives of the Imam of Oman. The Government of India have viewed with concern the news of the military action which has taken place in Oman...have expressed to the United Kingdom Government the concern and conveyed to them public feelings in India, in regard to this action."

The Sultanate of Oman had sovereignty over the Gwadar Port in present day Pakistan till 1958 when in September of that year, Pakistan paid £3 million (some say half that sum) to buy back the enclave, ending over 200 years of Omani control, before which it was a part of erstwhile India.

Expatriate community 
Oman has over five hundred thousand Indian nationals living there making them the largest expatriate community in Oman. They annually remit $780 million to India. India is a major destination for Omani students pursuing higher studies and in recent years there have been increasing numbers of medical tourists coming into the country from Oman. Oman has also been trying to promote itself as a tourist destination in India. Annually around 12,000 Indians visit Oman on tourist visas and that number is expected to triple by 2015.

Economic relations 
In 2010, bilateral trade between India and Oman stood at $4.5 billion. India was Oman's second largest destination for its non-oil exports and its fourth largest source for imports. Indian and Omani firms have undertaken joint ventures in a wide range of sectors including fertilisers, pharmaceuticals, energy and engineering. The Oman-India Fertiliser Company (OMIFCO) plant at Sur in Oman and the Bharat-Oman Oil Refinery at Bina have been set up as joint ventures between Indian public sector companies and Oman Oil Company.

Gas pipeline
India has been considering the construction of a 1,100-km-long underwater natural gas pipeline from Oman. Called the South Asia Gas Enterprise (SAGE), it will act as an alternative to the Iran–Pakistan–India pipeline. The project has been slow in materialising although it was first mooted in 1985.

Defence co-operation 

Oman is the first Gulf nation to have formalised defence relations with India. Both countries conducted joint military exercises in 2006 and subsequently signed a defense agreement. Following Prime Minister Manmohan Singh's visit to Oman in 2008, defence co-operation between the two countries was further stepped up. The Indian Navy has berthing rights in Oman, and has been utilising Oman's ports as bases for conducting anti-piracy operations in the Gulf of Aden. The Indian Air Force has also been holding biannual joint exercises with the Royal Air Force of Oman since 2009. Oman has approached India in order to fence along the Oman-Yemen border in order to protect the nation from growing unrest in Yemen. The standard issue rifle of the Royal Army of Oman is India's INSAS rifle. India has a listening post at Ras al Hadd. and birthing rights for the Indian Navy at Mascat naval base.

Naseem al-Bahr
Naseem al-Bahr (Arabic for Sea Breeze) is a bilateral maritime exercise between India and Oman. The exercise was first held in 1993. The tenth edition was held in January 2016.

Duqm

In February 2018, India announced that it had secured access to the facilities at Duqm for the Indian Air Force and the Indian Navy. Duqm had previously served as a port for the INS Mumbai.

See also
 Indians in Oman

References

External links

 Official website of Embassy of India, Muscat

 
Oman
Bilateral relations of Oman